Gurit (also Romanized as Gūrīt and Gūryat; also known as Goorkat and Gūrkat) is a village in Saghder Rural District, Jebalbarez District, Jiroft County, Kerman Province, Iran. At the 2006 census, its population was 12, in 4 families.

References 

Populated places in Jiroft County